The 1998–99 Macedonian Football Cup was the 7th season of Macedonia's football knockout competition. FK Vardar defended their title, having won their fourth title.

Competition calendar

Source:

First round

|}

Sources:

Group stage

The most results are unknown.

Group 1

Pobeda and Vardar were advanced to the quarterfinal, the other teams in group were Kumanovo and Sasa.

Group 2

Group 3

Group 4
Sileks and Osogovo were advanced to the quarterfinal, the other teams in group were Pelister and Ilinden Skopje.

Sources:

Quarter-finals
The first legs were played on 10 March and second were played on 17 March 1999.

|}

Semi-finals
The first legs were played on 7 April and the second were played on 21 April 1999.

|}

Final

See also
1998–99 Macedonian First Football League
1998–99 Macedonian Second Football League

References

External links
 1998–99 Macedonian Football Cup at rsssf.org
 Official Website
 Macedonian Football

Macedonia
Cup
Macedonian Football Cup seasons